is a Japanese professional golfer.

Yamamoto was born in Osaka. He won 13 tournaments on the Japan Golf Tour.

Professional wins (18)

Japan Golf Tour wins (13)

Japan Golf Tour playoff record (0–2)

Other wins (4)
1972 Setouchi Series Okayama leg
1973 Wizard Tournament
1975 Ocean Expo Golf Tournament
1986 Kuzuha International

Japan PGA Senior Tour wins (1)
2002 Okinawa Senior Open

Team appearances
World Cup (representing Japan): 1976

See also
List of golfers with most Japan Golf Tour wins

References

External links

Japanese male golfers
Japan Golf Tour golfers
Sportspeople from Osaka Prefecture
1951 births
Living people